Paige Flynn (born 20 November 1996) is a New Zealand swimmer. She competed in the women's 100 metre freestyle event at the 2018 FINA World Swimming Championships (25 m), in Hangzhou, China.

References

External links
 

1996 births
Living people
New Zealand female swimmers
New Zealand female freestyle swimmers
Place of birth missing (living people)
20th-century New Zealand women
21st-century New Zealand women